Singida may refer to:
Singida, a town in Tanzania
Singida Rural and Singida Urban, two districts in Tanzania, headquartered at Singida.
Singida Region, a region of Tanzania, headquartered at Singida.
Singida (fish), an extinct genus